The Ten Broek–Mollie McCarty match race was a match race on July 4, 1878, between Ten Broeck, a stallion from Kentucky, and Mollie McCarty, a mare from California. The race was held at the Louisville Jockey Club (now Churchill Downs) in front of a record crowd of 30,000. Both horses were champions of the period, and the win by Ten Broeck marked the first loss of Mollie McCarty's career. The race was immortalized in the folk song, Molly and Tenbrooks.

1878 in horse racing
1878 in American sports
July 1878 sports events